The Australian Indian Ocean Territories is the name since 1995 of an administrative unit under the Australian Department of Infrastructure, Transport, Regional Development, Communications and the Arts, consisting of two island groups in the Indian Ocean under Australian sovereignty:

 Christmas Island, where the administrator resides
 Cocos (Keeling) Islands, where the same officer also has jurisdiction as administrator but does not reside

Each of these island components has its own shire council: the Shire of Christmas Island and the Shire of Cocos.

The administrative unit does not have jurisdiction over the uninhabited Ashmore and Cartier Islands and Heard Island and McDonald Islands, despite these territories lying within the Indian Ocean.

Administration

Reviews
In 2004 a review of the territories was made.

In 2012 the administration was reviewed by Australian parliamentary visits and enquiry.

Farzian Zainal is a community representative for, and the Treasurer of, the Indian Ocean Territories Regional Development Organisation, which is administered by the Australian government.

Administrators

References

External links

 WorldStatesmen: Australia – Christmas Island
 WorldStatesmen: Australia – Cocos (Keeling) Islands

 
Island countries of the Indian Ocean
Dependent territories in Asia
Government of Australia
States and territories of Australia